Airpod may refer to:
 AIRPod, a car that runs on compressed air
 AirPods, wireless earbuds manufactured by Apple Inc.
 AirPods Pro, wireless earbuds manufactured by Apple Inc.
 AirPods Max, wireless headphones manufactured by Apple Inc.